During the Ili-Tacheng Incident, May 29, 1962, about 67,000 Chinese citizens of Kazakh and other ethnics in Xinjiang fled to neighbouring Soviet Union through ports at Khorgas of Ili and Baketu of Tacheng, causing steep decline of the population of borderlands. Since then, Xinjiang Production and Construction Corps moved into nearby regions and established a few state farms as a measure of national defence. Prominent people that fled to Soviet Union included PLA generals Margub Ishakov and Zunun Taipov.

After the collapse of Soviet Union, some of the previous refugees expressed their intention to return but were rejected by Chinese government.

References

1962 in China
1962 in the Kazakh Soviet Socialist Republic
20th century in Xinjiang
Ili Kazakh Autonomous Prefecture
 
China–Kazakhstan relations
People's Republic of China diplomacy
Demographics of Kazakhstan
May 1962 events in Asia
Xinjiang conflict
China–Soviet Union relations